Harutaeographa saba is a moth of the family Noctuidae. It is found in Pakistan and Afghanistan.

References

Moths described in 1996
Orthosiini